Maciej Żurawski (born 22 December 2000) is a Polish professional footballer who plays as a midfielder for Ekstraklasa club Warta Poznań.

References

External links

2000 births
Living people
Sportspeople from Toruń
Polish footballers
Association football midfielders
Poland youth international footballers
Poland under-21 international footballers
Elana Toruń players
Pogoń Szczecin players
Warta Poznań players
Ekstraklasa players
III liga players